Ethan Nichtern is an American author and Buddhist teacher. He is the author of The Road Home: A Contemporary Exploration of the Buddhist Path (Farrar, Straus and Giroux - North Point, 2015), which was selected as one of Best Books of 2015 by Library Journal, and was also named as one of 9 Books That Define 2015 by Tech Insider. His next book for Farrar, Straus and Giroux, The Dharma of The Princess Bride, was released in September 2017.

Nichtern has also authored One City: A Declaration of Interdependence (Wisdom Publications 2007) as well as various other poetry and fiction. He is also the founder of the Interdependence Project, a nonprofit organization dedicated to secular Buddhist study as it applies to activism, arts and media projects, and Western psychology. Nichtern has taught meditation and Buddhist psychology classes and retreats across North America since 2002. He is based in New York City.

Nichtern has discussed the relevance of Buddhism in the 21st century on ABC/Yahoo News, CNN with Rick Sanchez, NPR's Tell Me More with Michel Martin, Dan Harris of ABC News, Sally Singer with Vogue.com, in The New York Times, and in other news outlets.

Nichtern is the son of musician/composer David Nichtern, who is also a Buddhist teacher, and Janice Ragland, a painter who later became a psychotherapist. He was born in Los Angeles, California in 1978 and raised in New York City. On June 18, 2016, he married Marissa Dutton, and the two separated and later divorced in 2021.

References

External links 
 About Ethan, from Nichtern's official website
 Overcoming Spiritual Bypassing, a Dharma Talk for Tricycle: The Buddhist Review (May 2015)
 Press release detailing Nichtern's book deal with Farrar, Straus and Giroux for The Road Home

American Buddhist spiritual teachers
Living people
1978 births